Mediator of RNA polymerase II transcription subunit 16 is an enzyme that in humans is encoded by the MED16 gene.

Interactions
MED16 has been shown to interact with Thyroid hormone receptor alpha, Estrogen receptor alpha and Cyclin-dependent kinase 8.

References

Further reading

External links